Statistics of L. League Cup in the 1998 season.

Overview
Prima Ham FC Kunoichi won the championship.

Results

Preliminary round

East

West

Final round

Semifinals
Prima Ham FC Kunoichi 2-1 OKI FC Winds
Matsushita Electric Panasonic Bambina 2-1 Yomiuri Beleza

Final
Prima Ham FC Kunoichi 2-1 Matsushita Electric Panasonic Bambina

References

Nadeshiko League Cup
1998 in Japanese women's football